Dosso Airport  is an airport serving Dosso in Niger.

Airports in Niger